Sir Andrew John Popplewell PC, styled The Rt Hon Lord Justice Popplewell, is a Lord Justice of Appeal (a judge of the Court of Appeal in England and Wales), having previously served as a High Court judge.

Son of Sir Oliver Popplewell, he was educated at Radley College and Downing College, Cambridge. He has three children: Anna Popplewell, actress star of the Chronicles of Narnia series, Lulu Popplewell, who played Daisy in Love Actually, and Freddie Popplewell, a barrister.

He was called to the bar at Inner Temple in 1981. He was made a QC in 1997 and was a recorder from 2002 to 2011. He was appointed a judge of the High Court of Justice (Queen's Bench Division) and knighted in 2011.

On 21 October 2019, he was appointed to the Court of Appeal as a Lord Justice of Appeal.

References

Living people
People educated at Radley College
Alumni of Downing College, Cambridge
Members of the Inner Temple
Queen's Bench Division judges
Knights Bachelor
Lords Justices of Appeal
Members of the Privy Council of the United Kingdom
Year of birth missing (living people)